Athidhi is a 2007 Indian Telugu-language action romance film starring Mahesh Babu and Amrita Rao, directed by Surender Reddy and produced by G. Ramesh Babu, brother of Mahesh Babu, under their banner Krishna Pictures Private Limited. It was released on 18 October 2007 with 500 prints in 820 theaters all over the world. Athidhi finished 35 days in 400 centres successfully. The film was remade in Bengali language in Bangladesh as Durdorsho Premik (2012), starring Shakib Khan and Apu Biswas.

Plot
An orphan boy wanders through Delhi looking for a job. When selling balloons, he sees a girl whose name is Amrita and gives her a free balloon. A few days later, during a storm, Amrita finds the boy getting drenched and gives him an umbrella. The umbrella is swept into a place nearby, where Amrita's parents are headed. The boy stops their car and tells them about the dangerous path ahead destroyed by the storm. As the boy has rescued Amrita's parents, they adopt him and name him Athidhi. One day, while driving Athidhi to a hostel, they are stopped by a psychopath teenager who mugs them and shoots the parents. In his rage, Athidhi lunges after the teen and manages to grab the gun. However, The police see Athidhi with a gun and Amrita's dead parents and arrests Athidhi. Amrita also thinks that Athidhi killed her parents and starts to hate him.

14 years later, Athidhi is released from prison and goes in search of the psychopath and Amrita. Athidhi becomes a hurdle to the local goons,  as he impedes their illegal operation. Once, he runs across a girl named Amrita chased by stalkers from her college. Amrita and Athidhi meet many times and soon starts to like Athidhi, but has to go back to Hyderabad before she can confess her feelings. When she tries to tell him that she is leaving, Athidhi realizes that the goons are after him, he continuously tells Amrita to leave and slaps her, when she doesn't listen. Amrita runs away crying. Later, Athidhi goes to Amrita to apologize, but only finds her friend Madhavi. She tells him that Amrita just wanted to tell him that she is leaving. They go to the cemetery to look for her.

Madhavi explains Amrita's origin to Athidhi, who leaves for Hyderabad to find her. Athidhi arrives in Hyderabad and decides to stay with Amrita's family, he learns about a dreaded gangster named Kaiser. Later, Athidhi realizes that Kaiser was the psychopath who killed Amrita's parents. Athidhi stops two attempts by Kaiser to murder Amrita. Meanwhile, Inspector Ajay Shastri is trying to track down Kaiser but Ajay dies in an explosion in his house, which was planned by Kaiser. Athidhi figures out that Ajay is actually Kaiser himself. Before Kaiser's house blew up, Kaiser managed to escape and MLA Maccha Srinu realizes that Ajay and Kaiser are the same person and succumbs to shock and dies from a heart attack.

Athidhi manages to kill Kaiser's men. Kaiser kidnaps Amrita and her younger sister, and he kills the sister. Kaiser leads Amrita to a dungeon, where he calls Athidhi, and tells him that he will kill Amrita if Athidhi does not rescue her in 12 hours. Athidhi kidnaps Kaiser's brother and agrees to trade him for Amrita. However, Kaiser kills his brother since, according to him, Kaiser should not have any weakness. Kaiser then reveals that he killed Amrita, to which Athidhi kills all Kaiser’s henchmen in rage. He beats Kaiser, and Kaiser then reveals that he didn’t kill Amrita, but she is on the verge of death. Amrita is severely cut in the nerves and stuck in a certain air tank, but is rescued, and Kaiser is killed. Thus, Athidhi and Amrita (who realizes that Athidhi is not her parents's killer) unite in the end.

Cast

 Mahesh Babu as Athidhi 
 Amrita Rao as Amrita
 Baby Annie as young Amrita
 Murali Sharma as Inspector Ajay Sastry/Qaiser
 Ashish Vidyarthi as Danny Bhai
 Kota Srinivasa Rao as Maccha Srinu, an MLA who works under Qaiser
 Ajay as Qaiser's brother
 Nassar as Amrita's Uncle, the Home Minister
 Brahmanandam as Shivram
 Sunil as Amrita's fiancé
 Ravi Prakash as Ravi, Athidhi's friend
 Pragathi as Amrita's sister in law
 Subbaraju as Ganni Bhai
 Maadhavi Latha as Madhavi, Amritha's friend
 Ashmitha Karnani as Amrita's mother
 Rajendran as Henchman
 Prabhakar as Goon
 Baby Karman Sandhu
 Hema
 Shankar Melkote
 Indrayudh Mandal (cameo) 
 Venu Madhav (cameo)
 Rajiv Kanakala as Amrita's father (cameo)
 Malaika Arora Khan (Item number in the song "Rathraina")

Crew
 Director: Surender Reddy
 Producer: Ramesh Babu
 Music: Mani Sharma
 Cinematography: Sameer Reddy
 Editor: Gowtham Raju
 Stunt director: Stun Siva

Remake
The film was remade in Bengali Bangladesh as Durdorsho Premik (2012) starring Shakib Khan, Apu Biswas and Misha Sawdagor.

Box office
 The film was released worldwide with 500 prints in 820 theaters across the globe.
Athidhi grossed  crore on its first day, and  crore in four days worldwide. It grossed  crore in eight days from Andhra Pradesh. In 11 days the film grossed  worldwide. The film grossed  crore by the four-week run at the worldwide Box office.

Soundtrack
The music was composed by Mani Sharma and released by Aditya Music.

Awards
 Nandi Award for Best Villain - Murali Sharma (2007)

References

External links

2007 films
Indian romantic action films
Films directed by Surender Reddy
Films scored by Mani Sharma
UTV Motion Pictures films
2000s Telugu-language films
Films shot in Switzerland
Films shot in Delhi
2007 action thriller films